Jacek Przebierała is a paralympic athlete from Poland competing mainly in category F37 discus and javelin events.

Jacek competed in the discus and javelin at the 2000 Summer Paralympics winning a bronze medal in the javelin.  He matched this performance, winning a second bronze n the javelin in the 2004 Summer Paralympics.

References

 725 lat historii i rozwoju miasta Wieluń

Paralympic athletes of Poland
Athletes (track and field) at the 2000 Summer Paralympics
Athletes (track and field) at the 2004 Summer Paralympics
Paralympic bronze medalists for Poland
Living people
Place of birth missing (living people)
Medalists at the 2000 Summer Paralympics
Medalists at the 2004 Summer Paralympics
Year of birth missing (living people)
Paralympic medalists in athletics (track and field)
Polish male discus throwers
Polish male javelin throwers
21st-century Polish people